Charles Watson-Wentworth, 2nd Marquess of Rockingham,  (13 May 1730 – 1 July 1782; styled The Hon. Charles Watson-Wentworth before 1733, Viscount Higham between 1733 and 1746, Earl of Malton between 1746 and 1750 and The Marquess of Rockingham in 1750) was a British Whig statesman, most notable for his two terms as Prime Minister of Great Britain. He became the patron of many Whigs, known as the Rockingham Whigs, and served as a leading Whig grandee. He served in only two high offices during his lifetime (Prime Minister and Leader of the House of Lords) but was nonetheless very influential during his one and a half years of service.

Early life: 1730–1751
A descendant of the 1st Earl of Strafford, Lord Rockingham was brought up at the family home of Wentworth Woodhouse near Rotherham in Yorkshire. He was educated at Westminster School. During the Jacobite rising of 1745 Rockingham's father made him a colonel and organised volunteers to defend the country against the "Young Pretender". Rockingham's sister Mary wrote to him from London, saying the King "did not doubt but that you was as good a colonel as he has in his army" and his other sister Charlotte wrote that "you have gained immortal honour and I have every day the satisfaction of hearing twenty handsome things said of the Blues and their Collonel". The march of the Jacobite army into northern England caused the Wentworth household to flee to Doncaster and Rockingham rode from Wentworth to Carlisle to join the Duke of Cumberland in pursuit of the "Young Pretender". Rockingham did this without parental consent and Cumberland wrote to Rockingham's father, saying that his "zeal on this occasion shows the same principles fix't that you yourself have given such strong proofs of". Rockingham wrote to his father that Cumberland "blamed me for my disobedience, yet as I came with a design of saving my King and country...it greatly palliated my offence". Rockingham's mother wrote to his father: "Though I hope you won't tell it him, never any thing met with such general applause, in short he is the hero of these times, and his Majesty talks of this young Subject, in such terms, as must please you to hear...in the Drawing Room no two people talk together, but he makes part of the discourse".

In April 1746 Rockingham's father was made a marquess (remaining the only marquess in the British peerage for quite some time) and Rockingham himself assumed the courtesy title of Earl of Malton. These honours came about due to the patronage of Henry Pelham. At this time Rockingham was travelling across Europe under the tutorship of George Quarme, as his father had decided against sending him to Cambridge. During his stay in Rome, Rockingham noted that amongst Englishmen Whigs outnumbered Jacobites four-to-one and there were "no Persons of rank about the Pretender" and that "the vile spirit of Jacobitism" was greatly declining. When in Herrenhausen, Hanover Rockingham met George II and made an impression: the King told Rockingham's uncle Henry Finch that he had never seen a finer or a more promising youth. In September 1750, two months before his father's death, he was raised to the Peerage of Ireland in his own right as Baron Malton and Earl Malton.

Early political career: 1751–1765

On 13 May 1751 (his 21st birthday), Rockingham inherited his father's estates. The rents from the land in Yorkshire, Northamptonshire and Ireland gave him an annual income of £20,000. He also controlled both of the borough parliamentary seats of Malton and one seat for the single-member borough of Higham Ferrers (Northants), along with twenty-three livings and five chaplaincies in the church. In July he was appointed Lord Lieutenant and custos rotulorum of the West Riding in Yorkshire, Lord Lieutenant of York city, and custos rotulorum of York city and county. In 1751–52 Rockingham joined White's, the Jockey Club and the Royal Society.

Rockingham's maiden speech was on 17 March 1752 in support of the Bill which disposed of Scottish lands confiscated in the aftermath of the Jacobite rising of 1745. He wanted the lands cultivated by people "employed in husbandry & handicrafts" who repudiated "plunder, rapine & rebellion". He said "the highlanders have remained in their ancient state, prolific, bold, idle, & consequently hives of rebellion". He compared his favoured policy with the policy which his ancestor Lord Strafford had used in Ireland. Rockingham's speech was not well received, with Horace Walpole criticising him for venturing into "a debate so much above his force". Rockingham's uncle William Murray, the Solicitor-General, believed him to be poorly educated so he employed Quarme as Rockingham's tutor again. Rockingham was for four months to study Demosthenes for oratory, to learn the histories of the Assyrian, Persian, Greek and Roman empires along with modern history. Murray wanted Rockingham to take after Sir Walter Raleigh.

In 1752, Rockingham was appointed Lord of the Bedchamber to George II and married Mary Bright. In 1753 the Rockingham Club was formed, containing the first Rockingham Whigs. Rockingham hired James Stuart, of whom he was a patron, to paint portraits of William III and George II for the club rooms. The club held monthly meetings and a list written in June 1754 showed it had 133 members. In 1755 the King appointed him to the honorary office of Vice Admiral of the North. During a French invasion scare in 1756 Rockingham raised a volunteer militia at his own expense and when rioting broke out against Army enlistments Rockingham restored order without the use of military force in Sheffield. The Secretary at War, Lord Barrington, wrote to him: "You are the only instance of a Lord lieutenant's exerting the civil authority upon these occasions". Rockingham asked in 1760 to be made a knight of the Order of the Garter and the King consented.

In 1760, George II died, and his grandson ascended the throne as George III. Rockingham was allied to the Duke of Newcastle and his supporters, whilst the new King had a favourite in Lord Bute. Rockingham believed that Bute and his supporters wanted to take "the whole Administration & Government of this country into their hands" and wanted Newcastle to resign now before he would be inevitably disposed of. Rockingham believed that the revolution in British politics since George III's accession was harmful to the country, since it removed the Whigs from their ascendancy which had settled the constitution and secured the House of Hanover on the British throne. Rockingham wrote to Newcastle:

...without flattery to your Grace, I must look and ever shall upon you and your connections as the solid foundations on which every good which has happened to this country since the [Glorious] Revolution, have been erected. ... What a medley of government is probably soon to take place & when it does what an alarm will ensue!

Rockingham resigned as Lord of the Bedchamber on 3 November 1762 in protest at the King's policies and other Whigs associated with the Duke of Newcastle did the same. The next month the King removed Rockingham from the office of Lord Lieutenant of the West Riding, Lord Lieutenant of the city and county of York, as custos rotulorum of the North and West Riding, as custos rotulorum of the city and county of York and as Vice Admiral of York and county.

Over the next several years, Rockingham gradually became the leader of those of Newcastle's supporters who were unwilling to reconcile themselves to the premierships of Bute and his successor, George Grenville.

Prime Minister: 1765–1766

The king's dislike, as well as Grenville's general lack of parliamentary support, led to his dismissal in 1765, and, following negotiations conducted through the medium of the king's uncle, the Duke of Cumberland, Lord Rockingham was appointed Prime Minister. Rockingham recovered the honours of which he had been deprived in 1762. Rockingham appointed his allies Henry Seymour Conway and the Duke of Grafton as secretaries of state. Also at this time, Edmund Burke, the Irish statesman and philosopher, became his private secretary and would remain a lifelong friend, political ally and advisor until Rockingham's death from influenza in 1782.

Rockingham's administration was dominated by the American issue. Rockingham wished for repeal of the Stamp Act 1765 and won a Commons vote on the repeal resolution by 275 to 167 in 1766. However Rockingham also passed the Declaratory Act, which asserted that the British Parliament had the right to legislate for the American colonies in all cases whatsoever.

However, internal dissent within the cabinet led to his resignation and the appointment of Lord Chatham as Prime Minister (the Duke of Grafton was appointed First Lord of the Treasury, one of the few cases in which those two offices were separate).

Opposition: 1766–1782

Rockingham spent the next sixteen years in opposition. He was a keen supporter of constitutional rights for colonists.

Rockingham wrote to Edmund Burke on 14 February 1771: "I fear indeed the future struggles of the people in defence of their Constitutional Rights will grow weaker and weaker. It is much too probable that the power and influence of the Crown will increase rapidly. We live at the period when for the first time since the Revolution, the power and influence of the Crown is held out, as the main and chief and only support of Government. If we...do not exert now, we may accelerate the abject state to which the Constitution may be reduced". On 24 May 1771 Benjamin Franklin arrived from the Rectory of Thornhill, where he had stayed with the Rev. John Michell, vicar to Rockingham's kinsman, fellow leading politician and keen advocate of colonists' rights Sir George Savile. Rockingham wrote to Augustus Keppel on 3 November 1779, saying that he believed the war against America could not be won, that the government was corrupt but not unpopular, and that the longer this continued the greater the danger to the liberties and the constitution of Britain: "Perhaps a total change of men and measures, & system in the Government: of this country might have effect on the councils of some foreign countries...who might think that it was no longer a Court system to combat, but that the whole nation wd; united & make the utmost efforts".

Rockingham was recruited to hunt down the Cragg Vale Coiners. He had thirty Coiners arrested by Christmas Day 1769.

Prime Minister: 1782

In 1782 he was appointed Prime Minister for a second time (with Charles James Fox and Lord Shelburne as Secretaries of State) and, upon taking office, pushed for an acknowledgement of the independence of the United States, initiating an end to British involvement in the American War of Independence.

Due to rising unemployment, in this second premiership, Rockingham's administration saw the passage of Gilbert's Act, the Relief of the Poor Act 1782, after 17 years of opposing Thomas Gilbert's ideas, this saw the creation of unions of civil parishes, later officially called unions under Gilbert's Act, to provide outdoor relief and set up workhouses.

Paul Langford has asserted that the Rockingham administration "represented a landmark in constitutional history. The ministerial changes of 1782 involved a more extensive upheaval among office-holders than any since 1714, virtually replacing one administration with another drawn from opposition".

Rockingham's second term was short-lived, for Lord Rockingham died fourteen weeks later at the beginning of July from an influenza epidemic. He was replaced as Prime Minister by Lord Shelburne, who was more reluctant to accept the total independence of America and proposed a form of Dominion status, but by April 1783 he succeeded in securing peace with America and this feat remains his legacy.

Rockingham was buried in the Strafford family vault in York Minster in Yorkshire.

Legacy
Rockingham's estates, but not his marquessate, passed to his nephew William Fitzwilliam, 4th Earl Fitzwilliam. Burke wrote to Fitzwilliam on 3 July 1782: "You are Lord Rockingham in every thing. ... I have no doubt that you will take it in good part, that his old friends, who were attached to him by every tie of affection, and of principle, and among others myself, should look to you, and should not think it an act of forwardness and intrusion to offer you their services". On 7 July 150 supporters of Rockingham met at Fitzwilliam's house and decided to withdraw support for Lord Shelburne's administration. The old Rockingham party fragmented, with Fox and the Duke of Portland leading a coalition of Whigs. The Whig party further split over the French Revolution, with Burke writing to Fitzwilliam on 4 January 1797: "As to our old friends, they are so many individuals, not a jot more separated from your Lordship, than they are from one another. There is no mutual affection, communication, or concert between them".

The Whig historian Thomas Babington Macaulay was an admirer of Rockingham and his Whig faction:

Places named after Lord Rockingham

Canada
 Rockingham, Nova Scotia

United States
 Rockingham County, New Hampshire
 Rockingham County, North Carolina
 Rockingham County, Virginia
 Rockingham, Vermont
 Rockingham, North Carolina
 Wentworth, North Carolina

Cabinets of Lord Rockingham

1765–1766

1782

Titles
The Hon. Charles Watson-Wentworth (1730–1733)
Viscount Higham (1733–1746)
Earl of Malton (1746–1750)
The Rt. Hon. The Earl Malton (1750–1750)
The Most Hon. The Marquess of Rockingham (1750–1751)
The Most Hon. The Marquess of Rockingham, FRS (1751–1761)
The Most Hon. The Marquess of Rockingham, KG, FRS (1761–1765)
The Most Hon. The Marquess of Rockingham, KG, PC, FRS (1765–1782)

Ancestry

Arms

Notes

Further reading
C. Collyer, 'The Rockinghams and Yorkshire politics, 1742–61', The Thoresby Miscellany, 12, Thoresby Society, 41 (1954), pp. 352–82.
A. Cox and A. Cox, Rockingham Pottery and Porcelain, 1745–1842 (1983).
G. H. Guttridge, The Early Career of Lord Rockingham, 1730–1765 (University of California, 1952).
R. J. Hopper, 'The second marquis of Rockingham, coin collector', Antiquaries Journal, 62 (1982), pp. 316–46.
G. Thomas, earl of Albemarle [G. T. Keppel], Memoirs of the Marquis of Rockingham and His Contemporaries, 2 vols. (1852).
R. B. Wragg, 'The Rockingham mausoleum (1784–1793)’, Yorkshire Archaeological Journal, 52 (1980), pp. 157–66.
Thesis
Bloy, Marjorie (1986) Rockingham and Yorkshire : The political, economic and social role of Charles Watson-Wentworth, the second Marquis of Rockingham. PhD thesis, University of Sheffield.

External links

More about Charles Wentworth, Marquess of Rockingham

|-

|-

|-

|-

|-

1730 births
1782 deaths
People educated at Westminster School, London
Alumni of St John's College, Cambridge
18th-century heads of government
Knights of the Garter
Lord-Lieutenants of the West Riding of Yorkshire
Members of the Privy Council of Great Britain
Prime Ministers of Great Britain
Leaders of the House of Lords
Deaths from influenza
Marquesses of Rockingham
Watson-Wentworth, Charles
Peers of Ireland created by George II
Burials at York Minster